The Treaty of Cession of Tutuila, also known as the Deed of Cession of Tutuila, was a treaty between several chiefs of the island of Tutuila and the United States signed on April 17, 1900, whereby the chiefs swore allegiance to, and ceded the island of Tutuila to, the United States, which now forms part of American Samoa. It came about because of the Second Samoan Civil War and the Tripartite Convention of 1899 between the United States, the United Kingdom, and the German Empire. It was ratified by the United States Congress by the Ratification Act of 1929.

It was signed on April 17, 1900, in the Gagamoe area in Pago Pago. The first American flag was raised later that same day on Sogelau Hill in Fagatogo.

See also 
 Treaty of Cession of Manu'a
 Tripartite Convention
 History of American Samoa

References

External links 
 
  (original)

History of American Samoa
Tutuila
Treaties of Samoa
Treaties of the United States
Treaties concluded in 1900
1900 in American Samoa
Treaties entered into force in 1900
Treaties entered into force in 1929
1900 in American law
1900 in international relations
1900s in Samoa
American Samoa law
Politics of American Samoa